Theater am Michelsberg is a theatre in Bamberg, Bavaria, Germany.

Theatres in Bavaria